The Upper Crust Pizzeria is an American pizzeria chain with six locations in the Boston area along with another three in California. The three locations are in the following places: Beverly Hills, Culver City, and Los Angeles.

History
The first pizzeria opened in the Beacon Hill neighborhood on Charles Street in 2001. It grew to 14 locations and developed a cult following before declaring bankruptcy in 2012. The company was purchased in 2013 by Quabbin Capital, a Boston based private equity firm investing in US manufacturing and consumer goods companies. Its former CEO, RJ Dourney, was previously CEO of Così, but was fired in 2016 shortly before the company filed for bankruptcy.

Controversies
A United States Department of Labor investigation of the company's pay practices from April 2007 through April 2009 revealed that Upper Crust’s hourly workers were paid straight time even after they exceeded 40 hours in a week. The company was ordered to pay more than US$341,000 in back wages to about 121 workers for uncompensated overtime. The Labor Department began a new investigation of the company in 2010.

On July 16, 2010, a lawsuit was filed against the company by two former employees, claiming that the Upper Crust had forced employees to give back thousands of these dollars. The lawsuit claims that Upper Crust made illegal deductions from the plaintiff's wages, paid below the legal minimum wage, and retaliated against those who complained. The plaintiffs were described as "disgruntled ex-employees... trying to figure out a way to extort money from our business", but in 2012 the company's former chief financial officer, David Marcus, swore an affidavit saying that the Upper Crust had devised a scheme to wrest the money back which included the cashing of forged checks.
Marcus himself was accused of financial mishandling of the company’s finances which led to his plea agreement. As part of his deal, David Marcus signed an affidavit, contrary to his sworn testimony under oath, that the company attempted to take back wages in exchange for a release of liability by Shannon Liss-Riordan.

On December 20, 2010 a former operations manager at Upper Crust filed a lawsuit that accuses the Boston pizza chain of retaliating against him after he reported the company to the US Department of Labor for allegedly violating wage and hour laws.

In 2011, The Boston Globe reported that several former employees claimed that United States Immigration and Customs Enforcement (ICE) was investigating the company's alleged hiring of illegal immigrants and other labor violations. Labor and student groups including Massachusetts Jobs with Justice have organized boycotts and protest over the company's labor practices.  The company has characterized the boycotts as misguided.  The company was ultimately not charged for any wrongdoings by any of the various agencies.

In 2012, Upper Crust co-owners Joshua Huggard and Brendan Higgins sued Tobins, alleging that he had used more than $750,000 in company money for personal expenses, such as the purchase of a small airplane. Tobins was placed on leave from the company, but it was eventually discovered that both Huggard and Higgins owed Tobins more than $1 million in unpaid royalties.

Tobins, Huggard and Higgins settled their lawsuit in August 2012.  Under the terms of the settlement, Tobins paid Huggard and Higgins $250,000 and assumed partial liability for the class action lawsuit by former Upper Crust employees, the Department of Labor investigation, and a lawsuit by Upper Crust's construction firm. In exchange, Tobins received the rights to the Upper Crust name. Ultimately Huggard and Higgins fraudulently re-directed the settlement funds for their own personal expenses which were slated to be paid to ZVI Construction. Finally, Huggard and Higgins took ownership of the Upper Crust restaurants in Back Bay, Fenway, Harvard Square, Hingham, Lexington, State Street, South End, Summer Street, Waltham, Washington DC, Watertown, and Wellesley.

Huggard's and Higgins’ company filed for bankruptcy in late 2012, shuttering all of its locations.

UC Acquisitions, a private equity firm with ties to Upper Crust founder Jordan Tobins, purchased some locations from the bankruptcy estate of Huggard's and Higgins' firm. The location in Harvard Square was subsequently purchased by attorney Shannon Liss-Riordan who had represented the chain's employees in a lawsuit, to be re-opened as a partly employee-owned pizzeria but has since closed as of winter 2018.  Since UC Acquisitions took control of Upper Crust, many franchisees have elected to cut ties with the company. As of April 2013, Tobins or UC Acquisitions control the Upper Crust name and the locations in Beacon Hill, Brookline, Lexington, South End, Watertown, and Wellesley.

Jordan Tobins has since settled all legal matters related to his involvement with Upper Crust, including the back wages to the employees as well as all tax liabilities with Massachusetts.

Joshua Huggard and Brendan Higgins still remain responsible for any unpaid meals taxes, although Brendan Higgins now owns Peel Pizza Co and Joshua Huggard was a manager for Oath Pizza, a chain owned by his brother in law.

References

External links
Official website

Pizza chains of the United States
Restaurants established in 2001
Restaurants in Boston
American companies established in 2001
2001 establishments in Massachusetts
Companies that filed for Chapter 11 bankruptcy in 2012